Mathieu Voyemant is a French slalom canoeist who competed at the international level from 2001 to 2009.

He won a silver medal in the C2 team event at the 2007 ICF Canoe Slalom World Championships in Foz do Iguaçu. He also won a silver medal in the C2 event at the 2009 European Championships in Nottingham.

His partner in the C2 boat was Damien Troquenet.

References

Living people
French male canoeists
Year of birth missing (living people)
Medalists at the ICF Canoe Slalom World Championships